Zotique Mageau (April 6, 1865 – March 14, 1951) was an Ontario merchant, notary and political figure. He represented Sturgeon Falls in the Legislative Assembly of Ontario as a Liberal member from 1911 to 1926.

He was born in Sainte-Julienne, Quebec, the youngest son of Fabien (Félix) Mageau and Judith Roy. In 1887, he married Saladine Serré; he married Clara Perrault in 1912 after her death. He opened a general store in Sturgeon Falls with his brother-in-law, Eugène Serré. He also established a lumber company, and was one of the founders of Sturgeon Falls, Ontario.

External links 
 Fonds Zotique-Mageau: Notes biographiques
 

1865 births
1951 deaths
Franco-Ontarian people
Ontario Liberal Party MPPs
People from West Nipissing